The Astral Crown is a gold crown surmounted with eight low points. The centrals and laterals points are topped with a star, with an unspecified number of points, between two wings.

In heraldry, an astral crown is mounted atop the shields of coats of arms of units belonging to some air forces or the personal arms of its distinguished commanders.

Its creation became necessary after the founding of the Royal Air Force in the UK, because there was no Roman military award device for Aerial warfare equivalent to the Naval crown for navies and the Camp crown for armies.

Some air forces of other countries adopted variants of the astral crown.

Gallery

See also

Crown (heraldry)
Camp crown
Celestial crown
Mural crown
Naval crown
Celestial crown
Heraldry
Military aviation

References
Heraldic Headgear, American Heraldry Society.
Astral Crown definition. Merrian Webster.
Fox-Davies, Arthur Charles (1909) A Complete Guide to Heraldry, Chapter XXIII: Crest, Coronets and Chapeaux.

Astral
Crowns in heraldry
Military heraldry
Military aviation